The 2013 Faroe Islands Cup was the 59th edition of the Faroe Islands domestic football cup. It started on 30 March 2013 and ended with the final on 24 August 2013. Víkingur Gøta were the defending champions, having won their second cup title the previous year. The winner of the competition qualified for the first qualifying round of the 2014–15 UEFA Europa League.

Only the first teams of Faroese football clubs were allowed to participate. The preliminary round involved only teams from 1. deild, 2. deild and 3. deild competitions. Teams from the highest division entered the competition in the first round.

Preliminary round
Three clubs from the 2. deild and one club from the 3. deild entered this round. These matches took place on 30 March 2013. The draw for this round was made on a live TV broadcast on KVF's show 3-2 on 11 March 2013.

|}

First round
The two winners from the preliminary round, all ten clubs from the Faroe Islands Premier League and four clubs from the 1. deild entered this round. The matches took place on 14 April 2013. The draw for this round was made on a live TV broadcast on KVF's show 3-2 on 11 March 2013.

|}

Quarterfinals
The matches took place on 5 May 2013.

|}

Semifinals
The ties were played over two legs on 29 May and 7 August 2013.

|}

Final

Top goalscorers

Updated to games played on 24 August 2013
Source: FaroeSoccer

References

External links
 Official site 
 Cup in FaroeSoccer.com

Faroe Islands Cup seasons
Cup
Faroe Islands Cup